Lychniscosida is an order of sponges belonging to the class Hexactinellida.

Families:
 Aulocystidae
 Becksiidae
 Callodictyidae
 Callodictyonidae
 Calypterellidae
 Calyptrellidae
 Camerospongiidae
 Coeloptychidae
 Coeloscysphiidae
 Coscinoporidae
 Cypellidae
 Cypelliidae
 Dactylocalycidae
 Diapleuridae
 Oncotoechidae
 Polyblastidiidae
 Sporadopylidae
 Ventriculitidae

References

Hexactinellida
Sponge orders